Racing Club Aussillon Mazamet XIII are a French Rugby league club based in Aussillon, Tarn in the Midi-Pyrénées region. The club plays in the Midi-Pyrenees regional National Division 2. Founded in 1970 the club plays home games at the Stade Rene Carayon.

Club details 

President:
Club Address: Racing Club Aussillon Mazamet XIII, local du Deves, 81200 Aussillon
Tel:
Email:

See also 

National Division 2

References

External links 

 

1970 establishments in France
French rugby league teams
Rugby clubs established in 1970
Sport in Tarn (department)